Skowron (less commonly Skowroń) is a surname. It is derived from the Polish noun skowron ("hoopoe-lark"). The surname may refer to:
 Alf Skowron, Canadian politician
 Bill Skowron (1930–2012), American baseball player
 Chip Skowron, American hedge fund portfolio manager convicted of insider trading
 Dorota Skowron, Polish astronomer
 Joanna Skowroń (born 1979), Polish sprint canoer
 Łukasz Skowron (born 1991), Polish footballer

See also
 
 Skowroński

Polish-language surnames